The Bundesstraße 468 is a German federal highway. It serves to connect the Bundesstraße 8 between Mädelhofen and Waldbüttelbrunn with the nearby Bundesautobahn 3. With a length of 1.3 kilometers, the Bundesstraße 468 is currently the shortest federal highway in the German federal highway network.

468